Yawning Sons is a British-American collaborative musical project formed in 2008 by members of the psychedelic rock bands Yawning Man and Sons of Alpha Centauri. Often associated with the Palm Desert Scene, the project's nature has been compared to The Desert Sessions project founded by Josh Homme.

History
In 2008, Yawning Man guitarist Gary Arce was invited to the United Kingdom by Sons of Alpha Centauri to produce new tracks, but upon arrival, the idea of simply producing the record was scrapped. Within one week, Arce and Sons of Alpha Centauri wrote and recorded an entire album's worth of material together.

The album, entitled Ceremony to the Sunset, was released on 23 July 2009 by Australian label Lexicon Devil Records. Receiving generally positive reviews, the album was placed eighth on The Obelisk'''s Top 10 Albums of 2009. A deluxe vinyl edition of the album was released by Alone Records in 2014. In 2010, in collaboration with WaterWays, a project that includes Arce, fellow Yawning Man member Mario Lalli and Fatso Jetson drummer Tony Tornay, the group followed up with a split EP entitled Yawning Sons/WaterWays that also received generally favourable reviews. The album was mastered at Abbey Road Studios in London and released by Space Age & Cheesecake Records on 24 December 2010.

In April 2013, Yawning Sons performed on the main stage on the opening night of the London DesertFest alongside Yawning Man and Fatso Jetson. However, they had to cut their set short due to technical difficulties with Arce's guitar, only able to deliver full performances of "Meadows" and "Ghostship/Deadwater".

On 26 March 2021, Yawning Sons released their second album, Sky Island. 

Members
Current members
 Gary Arce – guitar, lapsteel
 Mario Lalli – vocals
 Marlon King – guitar
 Nick Hannon – bass
 Blake – keyboards
 Stevie B. – drums

Former members
 Scott Reeder – vocals
 Wendy Rae Fowler – vocals

Discography
Studio albums
 Ceremony to the Sunset (2009)
 Ceremony to the Sunset  (2014)
 Sky Island (2021)

Extended plays
 Yawning Sons/WaterWays''  (2010)

References

External links
 
 Yawning Sons at Bandcamp
 

Musical groups established in 2008
Musical collectives
Rock music groups from California
English stoner rock musical groups
American stoner rock musical groups